Matty Grooves Records is a record label which was started by the members of Fairport Convention in 2004, when Woodworm Records was put into hold.  The name is derived from the English folk song "Matty Groves".

Release list

DVD release list

See also
 List of record labels

Record labels established in 2004
Folk record labels
British independent record labels